The Sweden women's national cricket team represents the country of Sweden in women's cricket matches.

In April 2018, the International Cricket Council (ICC) granted full Women's Twenty20 International (WT20I) status to all its members.

History

Sweden women's team played its first T20 international match against Norway on 29 August 2021.

In 2023, it was announced Sweden would participate in the qualifying process for the ICC Women's T20 World Cup for the first time, by playing in the Europe Division Two qualifier in Jersey.

Records and statistics
International Match Summary — Sweden Women
 
Last updated 14 November 2022

Twenty20 International

T20I record versus other nations

Records complete to WT20I #1303. Last updated 14 November 2022.

See also
 List of Sweden women Twenty20 International cricketers

References

External links
 Swedish Cricket Federation

Women's national cricket teams
Cricket
Sweden in international cricket